The Abraham Curry House, at 406 N. Nevada St. in Carson City, Nevada, was built c. 1871.  It was listed on the National Register of Historic Places in 1987.  It is a one-story masonry building that was home for Carson City founder Abraham Curry (d. 1873), who was first Superintendent of the United States Mint in Carson City.

References

External links

Historic American Buildings Survey in Nevada
Houses completed in 1871
Houses on the National Register of Historic Places in Nevada
National Register of Historic Places in Carson City, Nevada
Houses in Carson City, Nevada